Peter James (born 7 March 1947 in Sydney) is an Australian cinematographer and director of photography. James is a member of the American Society of Cinematographers (ASC), an organization that offers membership to directors of photography only "by invitation, based on an individual’s body of work".

James has been either cinematographer or director of photography on more than thirty films since 1973 when he worked on the Australian film Avengers of the Reef. James has won Australian Cinematographers Society's (ACS) Milli Award four times, Australian Film Institute's Award for Best Achievement in Cinematography three times and was nominated for the award for Outstanding Cinematography for a Miniseries or Movie at the 56th Primetime Emmy Awards for his work on the 2003 television film And Starring Pancho Villa as Himself.

In 1999, James was inducted into the Australian Cinematographers Society Hall of Fame for having "made a substantial contribution to the industry and the Society, as well as having left a legacy of fine work and having been responsible for training and influencing others."

Partial filmography

References

External links
 

1947 births
Australian cinematographers
Living people
People from Sydney
Best Cinematography Genie and Canadian Screen Award winners